Randi Criner Miller (born November 3, 1983) is an American wrestler, who competed in the 63 kg weight class at the 2008 Summer Olympics and won a bronze medal. She has now made a transition to mixed martial arts.

Mixed martial arts career
Miller was scheduled to make her mixed martial arts debut on August 29, 2010 in Tokyo, Japan against Hiroko Yamanaka. Miller withdrew from the fight because she was worried she was not ready to make her pro debut.

Miller's fight with Yamanaka was later announced for Jewels 11th Ring on December 17, 2010, but was officially cancelled again on December 6.

Miller made her MMA debut against Mollie Ahlers-Estes at Invicta Fighting Championships 1 on April 28, 2012. She won the fight via TKO in the third round.

Career highlights
 Texas Wrestling Hall of Fame Inductee
 2008 U.S.A. Wrestling Female Wrestler of the Year
 2008 U.S. Olympic Committee Female Wrestler of the Year
 Olympic Bronze Medalist
 U.S. Olympic Team Trials Champion
 U.S. Senior Nationals Champion & Outstanding Wrestler award
 New York Athletic Club Champion & Outstanding Wrestler award
 Dave Schultz Memorial Champion & Outstanding Wrestler award
 Cliff Keen College National Duals Outstanding Wrestler award
 University Nationals Champion
 Pan-American Champion
 National Team Member
 6x Senior All-American
 U.S. Olympic Training Center resident athlete
 Attended Northern Michigan University, MacMurray College, and Neosho County Community College

Mixed martial arts record

|-
| Win
|align=center| 1-0
|  Mollie Estes
| TKO (punches)
| Invicta FC 1: Coenen vs. Ruyssen
| 
|align=center| 3
|align=center| 3:27
| Kansas City, Kansas, United States
|

References

External links
 
 
 
 Randi Miller at AwakeningFighters.com

1983 births
Living people
African-American mixed martial artists
African-American sport wrestlers
American female mixed martial artists
American female sport wrestlers
Featherweight mixed martial artists
Mixed martial artists utilizing collegiate wrestling
Mixed martial artists utilizing freestyle wrestling
Medalists at the 2008 Summer Olympics
Olympic bronze medalists for the United States in wrestling
Wrestlers at the 2008 Summer Olympics
21st-century African-American sportspeople
21st-century African-American women
20th-century African-American people
20th-century African-American women